Baothghalach Mór Mac Aodhagáin (1550–1600) was an Irish poet.

Reputedly from Duniry, he was of the Mac Aodhagáin clan of poets. In his lifetime, his family were keepers of Leabhar Breac. His poems were edited by Lambert McKenna  in 1939.

References

 Lambert McKenna (ed.) (1939) Aithdioghluim Dána, Dublin, Irish Texts Society.

1550 births
1600 deaths
People from County Galway
Irish-language poets
16th-century Irish poets
People of Elizabethan Ireland